The Flying Dutchman (Swedish: Flygande holländaren) is a 1925 Swedish silent drama film directed by Karin Swanström and starring Anders de Wahl, Werner Fuetterer and Torsten Hillberg.

Cast
 Anders de Wahl as 	Pelle Frisk
 Werner Fuetterer as 	Sven
 Torsten Hillberg as 	Georg
 Margareta Wendel as Beatrice
 Sture Baude as 	Svensen
 Edit Rolf as 	Karin
 Edvin Adolphson as 	Cousin John
 Karin Swanström as 	Mother Tine
 Emmy Albiin as 	Grandma

References

Bibliography
 Gustafsson, Tommy. Masculinity in the Golden Age of Swedish Cinema: A Cultural Analysis of 1920s Films. McFarland, 2014.
 Qvist, Per Olov & von Bagh, Peter. Guide to the Cinema of Sweden and Finland. Greenwood Publishing Group, 2000.
 Wredlund, Bertil. Långfilm i Sverige: 1920-1929. Proprius, 1987.

External links

1925 films
1925 drama films
Swedish drama films
Swedish silent feature films
Swedish black-and-white films
Films directed by Karin Swanström
1920s Swedish-language films
Silent drama films
1920s Swedish films